Ali Sarfraz (born 21 December 1987) is a Pakistani cricketer who plays for Islamabad. He was the leading run-scorer for Islamabad in the 2018–19 Quaid-e-Azam Trophy, with 487 runs in five matches.

In September 2019, he was named in Northern's squad for the 2019–20 Quaid-e-Azam Trophy tournament.

References

External links
 

1987 births
Living people
Pakistani cricketers
Islamabad cricketers
Cricketers from Rawalpindi